Won Cheon-seok (1330-?), also known by his pen name Ungok, widely considered a political hermit during late Goryeo Dynasty to early Joseon Dynasty and has been known as the writer of Heohoga, a song of reminiscence of the past (i.e. Goryeo Dynasty) in Cheong-gu-young-un, a collective edition of Korean traditional poems. He was born in Gaeseong in 1330. He was a member of the Wonju Won clan, and the son of Won Yun-jeok.  He was a bright child and excelled in school. He passed Jinsasi, a civil service exam in Goryeo when he was 27. However he was deterred from entering into government by the chaotic political circumstances in the late Goryeo. He once taught Lee Bang-won, who became King Taejong of Joseon Dynasty later. He was summoned several times and even paid a visit by Taejong himself when he took over the throne but Ungok refused to join the Cabinet. He lived in seclusion and remained as a man of integrity for all his life. In his later life he got interested in Taoism as well as Buddhism even though he was a Confucian himself. He suggested the trinity of the three ideas called Sam-gyo-Il-Chi-ron. He wrote Ungoksisa, and edited Hwahaesajeon. Ungoksisa, reflected the society then and his philosophy as well. In the book, he argued the necessity to improve the system rather than replacing the dynasty and went on preaching that local officials should practice panel administration with mercy. Heo Mok, also known by his pen name Misu, once commented on Ungok's life "An honorable man never takes off his interest in the world even though he is hiding from the world". Although Ungok forsook the world, he never took eyes off the world. He kept his spirit pure throughout his life and became a paragon of the generations to come.

References

Goryeo writers
1330 births
Year of death unknown
Wonju Won clan
People from Wonju